Mark Allen Alford (born October 4, 1963) is an American politician and former television news journalist serving as the U.S. representative for  since 2023.

Early life and career
Alford was born in Baytown, Texas. He attended Sterling High School and the University of Texas at Austin, but left college without graduating.

Alford worked for KPRC-TV in Houston as a reporter and weekend anchor for News 2 Houston from 1995 and 1998. Before that, he was anchor for KDFW-TV in Dallas and a reporter with WPTV-TV in West Palm Beach; KWTX-TV in Waco; and KXAN-TV in Austin. In 1998, he went to WDAF-TV in Kansas City as an anchor for Fox 4 News and stayed there for 23 years. He announced his resignation on October 8, 2021.

U.S. House of Representatives 

He won the Republican nomination in the August 2 primary election and won the November 8 general election.

Personal life
Alford and his wife, Leslie, have three children. They live in Raymore, a suburb of Kansas City. Alford is a member of Evangel Church, an Assemblies of God megachurch in Kansas City.

References

External links
 Congressman Mark Alford official U.S. House website
Mark Alford for Congress campaign website

|-

1963 births
Living people
Missouri Republicans
People from Baytown, Texas
Republican Party members of the United States House of Representatives from Missouri
University of Texas at Austin alumni